The Cenotaph is a public monument in Montreal, Quebec, Canada, commemorating the First and Second World Wars and the Korean War.

Overview 

The Governor General of Canada, Lord Byng of Vimy, unveiled Montreal's Cenotaph in Dominion Square (now Place du Canada), in 1921. The monument was inspired by The Cenotaph, London (1920).

On the sixth anniversary of the armistice (November 11, 1924) a crowd assembled at the monument. At exactly eleven o'clock the assembled crowd fell silent for two minutes.

Notes

 Alan Gordon, Making Public Pasts: The Contested Terrain of Montreal's Public Memories, 1891–1930. McGill-Queen's University Press, 2001, p. 93.
 Monument aux braves de Montréal

External links
 

1921 in Canada
1921 sculptures
Bronze sculptures in Canada
Canadian military memorials and cemeteries
Cenotaphs in Canada
Granite sculptures in Canada
Military history of Canada
Monuments and memorials in Montreal
Outdoor sculptures in Montreal
World War I memorials in Canada